Imbarco a mezzanotte (internationally released as Stranger on the Prowl, also known as Giacomo and Encounter) is a 1952 Italian drama film directed by Joseph Losey and featuring Paul Muni.  Muni traveled to Italy to star in the film partly as an act of solidarity and support for blacklisted friends living there in exile.

Plot
A disillusioned vagrant (Paul Muni) accidentally kills a shop owner, and is joined by a rebellious youngster in his flight from apprehension.

Cast
 Paul Muni	as The Stranger With A Gun
 Joan Lorring as Angela, a lonely woman
 Vittorio Manunta as Giacomo, a small boy
 Luisa Rossi as Giacomo's Mother
 Aldo Silvani as Peroni, the junk dealer
 Arnoldo Foà as Inspector-in-Charge
 Alfredo Varelli as The Neighborhood Patrolman
 Héléna Manson as Grocery Store Clerk 
 Enrico Glori as Signor Pucci
 Linda Sini as Signora Raffetto

References

External links
 
 

1952 films
1952 drama films
1950s Italian-language films
Film noir
Films directed by Joseph Losey
United Artists films
Italian drama films
Italian black-and-white films
1950s Italian films